1994 Baker Street: Sherlock Holmes Returns, or Sherlock Holmes Returns! In The Adventure of the Tiger's Revenge and sometimes shortened to just Sherlock Holmes Returns, is a 1993 American television movie about the fictional detective Sherlock Holmes, starring Anthony Higgins as Holmes. In its title and basic premise, it is very similar to a 1987 TV movie, The Return of Sherlock Holmes, but the plot details of the two films are quite different.

Plot
Sherlock Holmes is awakened in modern times from suspended animation as a result of an earthquake. He is aided in his recovery by Dr. Amy Winslow, who lives in Baker Street in San Francisco. Holmes pits his wits against the descendants of the Moriarty family, led by James Moriarty Booth. He is also aided by a new group of Baker Street Irregulars led by Zapper.

Cast
 Anthony Higgins as Sherlock Holmes
 Debrah Farentino as Amy Winslow
 Ken Pogue as James Moriarty Booth
 Kerry Sandomirsky as Mrs. Ortega
 Mark Adair-Rios as Zapper

Production
It was written and directed by Kenneth Johnson, and was broadcast on CBS. Higgins had previously played Professor Moriarty in Young Sherlock Holmes (1985). The television film was intended to lead to an ongoing series featuring Sherlock Holmes and Doctor Winslow.

Reception
Variety described the film as "derivative premise, thin content and production values, awkward dialogue...and consistent overacting."

Home media 
The film was released on DVD in Germany for Region 2 by PIDAX FILM.

References

External links

1993 television films
1993 films
1993 comedy films
1990s American films
1990s comedy mystery films
1990s English-language films
1990s parody films
American comedy mystery films
American comedy television films
American parody films
CBS network films
Films directed by Kenneth Johnson (producer)
Films set in San Francisco
Sherlock Holmes films
Sherlock Holmes pastiches
Television films as pilots
Television pilots not picked up as a series